Alla Horska (18 September 1929, Yalta — 17 November 1970, Vasylkiv) was a Ukrainian artist of the 1960s, monumentalist painter, one of the first representatives of the underground art movement, dissident, and human rights activist of the Sixtiers movement in Ukraine.

Biography 
In 1962 Alla Horska became one of the founders and active members of the Club of Creative Youth.

In 1962 Alla Horska, Vasyl Symonenko and Les Tanyuk revealed the unmarked mass grave sites of those "enemies of the Soviet state" disposed by NKVD in Bykivnia, Lukyanivsky and Vasylkivsky cemeteries. The activists declared it to the Kyiv City Council ("Memorandum II").

In 1965–1968 she took part in protests against the repressions of Ukrainian human rights activists: Bohdan and Mykhailo Horyn, Opanas Zalyvakha, Sviatoslav Karavansky, Valentyn Moroz, Vyacheslav Chornovil, and others. Because of this, she was persecuted by the Soviet security services. However, a kind of protection for her was that she, together with a group of artists, worked on monumental works of art in Donetsk and Krasnodon (now Sorokyne), which were considered important and had an ideological bias.

In 1967 Horska attended Viacheslav Chornovil’s trial in Lviv. There was a group of Kyiv activists who protested against the illegal conduct of court proceedings. The next year she signed Protest Letter 139 addressed to General Secretary of the Communist Party of the Soviet Union demanding to cease such illegal proceedings. Consequently, the KGB began pressuring and threatening the signatories of this letter.

Death 
Alla Horska was murdered in 1970 while under surveillance by the KGB. Her funeral was on 7 December 1970. It became a civil resistance campaign in which such well-known dissidents as Yevgen Sverstiuk, Vasyl Stus, Ivan Gel, and Oles Serhienko made their speeches.

Art 
She created dozens of works: mosaics, murals, stained glass, etc.

Honoring the memory

Films 
A Soviet Ukrainian Alla Horska | Beyond East and West

See also 

 Soviet dissidents

References

External links 

 Alla Horska on WikiArt

Ukrainian dissidents
20th-century Ukrainian painters
1929 births
1970 deaths
National Academy of Arts of Ukraine
National Academy of Visual Arts and Architecture alumni
Shevchenko State Art School alumni
People killed in KGB operations
Ukrainian resistance movement